The Oklan (Koryak: Ыӄлан) is a river in Kamchatka Krai, Russia. It is the second most important tributary of the Penzhina after the Belaya.

The name of the river comes from the Koryak "yalan" (Ыӄлан), meaning "icy way".

History
Russian Cossack explorers reached the Oklan river basin in the 17th century and built the Aklansk fort. The fort was abandoned in 1804. At that time the indigenous Koryaks were engaged in reindeer herding and fishing. The settlement was revived in the 20th century as a state farm dedicated to reindeer-breeding.

Course
The Oklan has its source in Mount Stolovaya, located in the western part of the Ichigem Range, at the NW end of the Koryak Highlands. It flows roughly eastwards along the southern limits of the range area, descending into a swampy floodplain with numerous small lakes where it splits into branches. Finally it meets the right bank of the Penzhina  from its mouth in the Bering Sea.

The river is fed mainly by snow and freezes in October, staying under thick ice until May. The melting of the ice in the river valley continues during the summer period.

Flora and fauna
The Oklan river basin is characterized by discontinuous permafrost with tundra vegetation, including mosses, lichens, dwarf shrubs, and sedges. There are birches and poplars growing along the river banks in the floodplain.

Among the fish species in the river the pike and the grayling deserve mention.

See also
Bering tundra
List of rivers of Russia

References

External links
 Проект переселения «Пенжинский муниципальный район» Общая характеристика (стр. 1 )
 Kamchatka Krai travel guide

Rivers of Kamchatka Krai
Koryak Mountains